Abdeslam Bouchouareb (born 3 June 1952) is an Algerian politician who had serverd as a Minister of Industry and Mines of Algeria

He was named in the 2016 Panama Papers leak.

On 1 July 2020, Bouchouareb was sentenced to 20 years in prison on corruption charges.

References 

Living people
Algerian politicians
1952 births
Place of birth missing (living people)
People named in the Panama Papers
21st-century Algerian people